Karen H. Jobes (born 1952) is an American biblical scholar who is Gerald F. Hawthorne Professor Emerita of New Testament Greek and Exegesis at Wheaton College. She has written a number of books and biblical commentaries. In 2015, she received the Evangelical Christian Publishers Association's Christian Book of the Year Award for "Bible Reference" books.

Education
Jobes was born and raised in New Jersey. She completed a BA in physics from Trenton State College in 1974 and an MS in computer science from Rutgers University in 1979. She became a Christian while at College. She returned to study and completed a Master of Arts in Religion (1989) and PhD (1995) in Biblical Hermeneutics from Westminster Theological Seminary. Her dissertation, titled The Alpha-Text of Esther: Its Character and relationship to the Masoretic Text, was supervised by Moisés Silva, with whom she went on to co-author Invitation to the Septuagint, which has become a standard textbook in studies of the Septuagint.

Career and research
Jobes worked in physics and computer science at Princeton University and Johnson and Johnson before returning to study theology.

Jobes has taught New Testament and written commentaries on both Old and New Testament books. From 2005 until 2015, she was the Gerald F. Hawthorne Professor of New Testament Greek and Greek Exegesis at Wheaton College. She taught biblical Greek classes and classes on the Septuagint. She has written a number of books out of her classroom teaching including Discovering the Septuagint, a guided reader for students working with the Greek biblical text, and Letters to the Church, a commentary on Epistle to the Hebrews and the General Epistles that provides a model for students to work through critical issues and draw their own conclusions.

Jobes translated the Codex Sinaiticus Esther for the British Library. She was also part of the NIV and TNIV translation committee for over ten years.

Awards and honors
In 2015, Jobes' commentary on the Johannine epistles won the Evangelical Christian Publishers Association's Christian Book of the Year Award for "Bible Reference" books. In 2018, the Society of Biblical Literature awarded Jobe its Status of Women in the Profession Outstanding Service in Mentoring award.

Personal life
Jobes married Forrest "Buzz" Jobes, a research physicist, in 1980 and has two stepsons. She and her husband are members of Oreland Evangelical Presbyterian Church.

Selected publications

Books

Chapters and articles

References

1952 births
Living people
The College of New Jersey alumni
Rutgers University alumni
Westminster Theological Seminary alumni
Academics from New Jersey
Translators of the Bible into English
21st-century biblical scholars
American biblical scholars
Female biblical scholars
Wheaton College (Illinois) faculty
Bible commentators
Female Bible Translators